Shawn Mitchell is a former Republican member of the Colorado Senate, representing the 23rd district from 2005 to 2013. Previously he was a member of the Colorado House of Representatives from 1999 to 2004.

Background 
Mitchell received a B.S. magna cum laude from Brigham Young University and graduated from law school at the University of California at Berkeley.

He is now an attorney in a private law practice in Denver and Adams counties. Mitchell served as Special Counsel to the Colorado Attorney General, where he was a legal policy advisor and one of the top aides to former Colorado Attorney General Gale Norton. He worked on significant litigation, including the Amendment 2 case and First Amendment litigation on issues of church and state. Mitchell also represented Colorado in fighting criminal appeals in the Colorado Court of Appeals and the Supreme Court.

Legislative career
Before serving in the senate, Mitchell served in the Colorado House of Representatives from 1999 to 2004. He was elected in 2004 to represent Senate District 23. Mitchell won his campaign for re-election against Joe Whitcomb in 2008. Term limited, he did not run for re-election in 2012.

Controversy
Mitchell came under fire in 2010 for "sexist" and "degrading remarks". The comments were made at a formal hearing of the Workers' Compensation committee: Mitchell tried to comfort a nervous witness, by stating, "I just want to pass on a tip that sometimes when I'm in committee and I'm nervous I relieve that by imagining the chairwoman in her underwear."

According to news sources Mitchell apologized saying his remarks were "inappropriate" and "unprofessional". Senator Morgan Carroll accepted his apology.

Private life 
Mitchell has also written for the conservative website Townhall.com.. Mitchell is a former Senior Fellow at the Independence Institute, a conservative and free-market think tank in Denver. He continues to write and speak often on public policy issues. He has served as the president of the Colorado Chapter of the Federalist Society. He also served 3 years on the Denver Rocky Mountain News Board of Editorial Contributors.

Mitchell and his wife Yvette have seven children.

References

Republican Party Colorado state senators
American Latter Day Saints
Brigham Young University alumni
University of California, Berkeley alumni
Republican Party members of the Colorado House of Representatives
Year of birth missing (living people)
Living people
21st-century American politicians